Emily Fleur Shuckburgh  is a climate scientist, mathematician and science communicator. She is Director of Cambridge Zero, the University of Cambridge's climate change initiative, and is a fellow of Darwin College, Cambridge. Her research interests include the dynamics of the atmosphere, oceans and climate and environmental data science. She is a theoretician, numerical modeller and observational scientist.

Emily Shuckburgh has led the United Kingdom Research and Innovation (UKRI) centre for doctoral training on the application of AI to the study of environmental risks.

Education
Shuckburgh attended Magdalen College, Oxford, where she earned a Bachelor of Arts degree in Mathematics in 1994. She subsequently completed Part III of the Mathematical Tripos at Trinity College, Cambridge followed by a PhD in applied mathematics at the University of Cambridge in 1999.

Career and research
Shuckburgh was a postdoctoral researcher at École normale supérieure in Paris  from 2001 to 2003 and at Massachusetts Institute of Technology  (MIT) in 2005 as a visiting scientist, working in the areas of atmosphere and ocean dynamics.
 2000-03 Research Fellow at Darwin College, Cambridge
 2001-03 EC Marie Curie Research Fellow at École normale supérieure (Paris)
 2003-06 Director, Geophysical and Environmental Fluid Dynamics Summer School, Dept Applied Mathematics & Theoretical Physics, University of Cambridge
 2009-15 Head, Open Oceans, British Antarctic Survey (BAS)
 2019 Reader, Department of Computer Science and Technology, University of Cambridge

In 2000, Shuckburgh became a research fellow of Darwin College, Cambridge, and a fellow in mathematics in 2003;  she holds several positions within the University of Cambridge – she is a reader in the Department of Computer Science and Technology, an associate fellow of the Centre for Science and Policy and fellow of the Cambridge Institute for Sustainability Leadership. Shuckburgh leads the UKRI Centre for Doctoral Training in the Application of AI to the Study of Environmental Risks.

She joined the British Antarctic Survey in 2006 where she led the Natural Environment Research Council (NERC) Ocean Regulation of Climate by Heat and Carbon Sequestration and Transports (ORCHESTRA) project. She became the Survey's head of Open Oceans in 2009, deputy head of the Polar Oceans Team in 2015, and a fellow in 2019. Her research interests include the dynamics of the atmosphere, oceans and climate and environmental data science. She is a theoretician, numerical modeller and observational scientist.

She serves as co-chair of the Royal Meteorological Society climate science communications group and chaired their scientific publications committee. She acted as an advisor to the UK Government on behalf of the NERC.

Science communication
Shuckburgh has written on climate science, sustainability and women in science for publications including the Financial Times, New Statesman and The Sunday Times. She has also written books, and was co-author of Climate Change for the Ladybird Expert series with the Prince of Wales and Tony Juniper. She serves on the board of the Campaign for Science and Engineering.

Publications
Her publications include:

Awards and honours
In 2016 she was awarded an Order of the British Empire (OBE) in the 2016 New Year Honours for "services to science and the public communication of science". She is a Fellow of the Royal Meteorological Society (FRMetS).

References

Living people
Year of birth missing (living people)
Alumni of Magdalen College, Oxford
Alumni of Trinity College, Cambridge
British climatologists
Women climatologists
Fellows of Darwin College, Cambridge
Officers of the Order of the British Empire
British Antarctic Survey